Ganwari Teddy Vidyalankara (born on December 16, 1955, as ටෙඩී විද්‍යාලංකාර [Sinhala]) is a Sri Lankan actor, and stunt director. Vidyalankara contributed more than 500 films across all languages including Sinhala, Tamil, English, Telugu and Hindi. He is the first stuntman to bring group stunts to Sri Lankan cinema.

Early life
Born in 1955 at Negombo, he completed education from Carey College, Colombo. He started gymnastics and other free style martial arts at the small age with the influence of Bruce Lee films. He started boxing at the school and got a chance to practice martial arts course started at YMBA Hall performed by overseas stuntmen.

Cinema career
In 1976, he attended to a party organized by his friend Shantha Kulatunga. At the party, he was able to meet one of oldest stuntman in Sinhala cinema, Dayananda Rodrigo. He invited Vidyalankara to participate as one of stuntman in the film Jeevana Ganga. His first stunt coordination came through the film Anusha in 1979.

Vidyalankara coordinate stunts in many foreign language films of many genre. This includes 22 English films, 14 Pakistani films, 12 Hindi and Tamil films. Some of his most notable stunt coordinations can be seen in the films such as Water, A Common Man, Midnight Children, Blood Heat and Jism.

Filmography and stunt coordination
 No. denotes the Number of Sri Lankan film in the Sri Lankan cinema.

References

Sri Lankan male film actors
Sinhalese male actors
Living people
1955 births
Stunt performers